Bai Chong'en is a noted Chinese economist. He holds the Mansfield Freeman Chair in Economics at Tsinghua University.  He studied at the University of Science and Technology of China, Harvard University and University of California, San Diego. His research interests are wide and he has published many well-cited papers in a wide range of subjects including those dealing with corporate governance, development economics, industrial and organisational economics, the role of incentives and public economics - often with a focus on China. Bai is an Independent Director of the Board of Directors of China Investment Corporation.

Selected publications 
Bai, C. E., Liu, Q., Lu, J., Song, F. M., & Zhang, J. (2004). Corporate governance and market valuation in China. Journal of Comparative Economics, 32(4), 599–616.

Bai, C. E., Hsieh, C. T., & Qian, Y. (2006). The return to capital in China (No. w12755). National Bureau of Economic Research.

References

External links
Bai Chong-en's page at Tsinghua University

People's Republic of China economists
Harvard University alumni
Living people
Academic staff of Tsinghua University
University of Science and Technology of China alumni
University of California, San Diego alumni
Year of birth missing (living people)
People's Republic of China writers